Bacchisa partenigricornis is a species of beetle in the family Cerambycidae. It was described by Breuning in 1968. It is known from Laos.

References

P
Beetles described in 1968